Mary Kamala Gunaseelan is a Sri Lankan Tamil teacher, politician and provincial councillor.

Gunaseelan was vice-principal of Arasaratnam Vidyalayam.

Gunaseelan contested the 2013 provincial council election as one of the Tamil National Alliance's candidates in Mullaitivu District but failed to get elected. She was nevertheless appointed to the Northern Provincial Council as one of the TNA's two bonus seats. After the election she was appointed to assist the Minister of Education, Cultural Affairs and Sports on libraries, museums and cultural matters. She took her oath as provincial councillor in front of Chief Minister C. V. Vigneswaran at Veerasingam Hall on 11 October 2013.

References

Living people
Members of the Northern Provincial Council
People from Northern Province, Sri Lanka
Place of birth missing (living people)
Sri Lankan Tamil politicians
Sri Lankan Tamil teachers
Sri Lankan Tamil women
Tamil National Alliance politicians
Tamil United Liberation Front politicians
Women legislators in Sri Lanka
Year of birth missing (living people)